Raving is a 2007 American short film written and directed by Julia Stiles, produced by Plum Pictures, and starring Bill Irwin and Zooey Deschanel.

Plot
In New York City, a man in a suit and tie has undisclosed problems: his corporate I.D. has expired and he's denied entrance to an office building. A young woman cadges money from strangers with an emotional story of losing her ride home and needing funds. One morning at a diner, he offers her a job. She accepts with an eye to anything of value in his flat. Then, his conversation turns to raving.

Availability
The film is hosted on Elle Magazine's website.

External links

"Raving" on Elle Magazine's website
"Raving" hosted on Elle Magazine's CDN

2007 films
2007 short films
2007 drama films
2000s English-language films
American drama short films
2000s American films